Lester Embree (1938-2017) was an American philosopher and Professor of Philosophy at Florida Atlantic University.

References

Philosophy academics
Continental philosophers

Duquesne University faculty

1938 births

2017 deaths